Janis Lynn Hape (March 10, 1958 – March 7, 2021), also known by her married name Janis Dowd, was an American competition swimmer.

Hape represented the United States as an 18-year-old at the 1976 Summer Olympics in Montreal, Quebec.  She competed in the preliminary heats of the women's 200-meter breaststroke, and recorded a best time of 2:45.57.

Hape attended the University of North Carolina at Chapel Hill, and swam for the North Carolina Tar Heels swimming and diving team in National Collegiate Athletic Association (NCAA) competition from 1977 to 1980. She died from heart failure on March 7, 2021, at the age of 62.

See also
 List of University of North Carolina at Chapel Hill alumni
 List of University of North Carolina at Chapel Hill Olympians

References

External links

1958 births
2021 deaths
American female breaststroke swimmers
North Carolina Tar Heels women's swimmers
Olympic swimmers of the United States
Sportspeople from Gary, Indiana
Swimmers at the 1976 Summer Olympics